USS Neosho may refer to the following ships of the United States Navy:

 , a single-turreted, wooden-hulled, river monitor (1863–1873)
 , Cimarron-class oiler (1939–1942), sunk at the Battle of the Coral Sea
 , Kennebec-class oiler, launched 1942, sold and renamed SS Catawba
 , the lead ship of the Neosho-class oilers (1954). Transferred to Military Sealift Command in 1978 and stricken in 1994

United States Navy ship names